William B. Gere was a farmer, Union Army officer during the American Civil War, and served as a territorial legislator in Minnesota during the 1850s. After the war he lived in Sumter County, Alabama and served in the Alabama House of Representatives. He was a Democrat.

He settled in Chatfield, Minnesota. A Civil War era photo of him and others survives. His younger brother Thomas Parke Gere served with him. The Minnesota Historical Society has some of his papers.

References

Members of the Alabama House of Representatives
Union Army officers
Members of the Minnesota Territorial Legislature